The Mississippi Senate is the upper house of the Mississippi Legislature, the state legislature of the U.S. state of Mississippi. The Senate, along with the lower Mississippi House of Representatives, convenes at the Mississippi State Capitol in Jackson.

The Senate is composed of 52 senators representing an equal number of constituent districts, with 57,063 people per district (2010 figures). In the current legislative session, the Republican Party holds 36 seats while the Democratic Party holds 16 seats, creating a Republican trifecta in the state government.

Like other upper houses of state and territorial legislatures and the federal U.S. Senate, the Senate can confirm or reject gubernatorial appointments to the state cabinet, commissions and boards and can create and amend bills.

Membership, terms and elections
According to the current Mississippi Constitution of 1890, the Senate is to be composed of no more than 52 members elected for four-year terms with no term limits. To qualify for election, candidates must be at least 25 years old, a qualified elector and resident in the state for the past four years, and be a resident of the district or county they are running to represent for the past two years. Elections to the Senate are held on the first Tuesday after the first Monday in November during the state general elections. If a vacancy occurs in the Senate before June 1, the governor must order an election within 30 days after the vacancy and give a 40 day notice to the appropriate counties where the seat is located. No special election occurs if the vacancy happens after June 1.

Powers and process
The state legislature is constitutionally-mandated to meet for 125 days every four years and 90 days in other years. The Senate reconvenes on a yearly basis on the Tuesday after the first Monday in January.

The Senate has the authority to determine rules of its own proceedings, punish its members for disorderly behavior, and expel a member with a two-thirds vote of its membership. Bills must undergo three readings in each house, unless two-thirds of the house dispenses with the rules. Amendments to bills must be approved by both houses. The Senate, in conjunction with the Mississippi House of Representatives, draws and approves both congressional and district boundaries. The congressional boundaries can be vetoed by the governor, while the district boundaries, created by a joint resolution between both houses, cannot be vetoed by the governor.

The governor has the power to veto legislation, but legislators can override the veto with a two-thirds decision.

Leadership
The Lieutenant Governor of Mississippi serves as the President of the Senate, but only casts a legislative vote if required to break a tie. In his or her absence, the President Pro Tempore presides over the Senate. The President Pro Tempore is elected by the majority party caucus followed by confirmation of the entire Senate through a Senate Resolution. Unlike other upper houses in state legislatures, the President Pro Tempore's power is limited. The Lieutenant Governor has the sole ability to appoint the chairmanships or vice chairmanships of various Senate committees, regardless of party size. The other Senate majority and minority leaders are elected by their respective party caucuses.

The President of the Senate is Mississippi Lieutenant Governor Delbert Hosemann. The President pro tempore is Republican Dean Kirby.

Composition (2020–2024)

Although the Democratic party retained their majority (27D to 25R) in the state Senate after the 2003 general election, a party switch by former Democratic Senator, James Shannon Walley of Leakesville threw control of the chamber to the Republicans.  Walley was elected as a Democrat in 2003 to represent District 43, which includes George, Greene, Stone, and Wayne counties, then announced he was switching parties and won re-election as a Republican.  Because the Lieutenant Governor at that time, Amy Tuck, was a Republican (and also a previous party switcher), this gave Republicans control of the Senate for the first time since Reconstruction and a de facto majority only on a tie vote.

Until January 2008, the Senate contained 25 Democrats and 27 Republicans. Democrats enjoyed a net gain of three seats in the November 6, 2007 statewide elections and won back control of the chamber by a 28–24 margin until Senator Nolan Mettetal announced his party switch in February, 2008.  The Senate balance was 27–25, with the Democrats holding the slim majority until Cindy Hyde-Smith switched parties, giving the GOP a 26–26 de facto majority, with Lieutenant Governor Phil Bryant holding the tiebreaker vote. After the switch of Ezell Lee on February 17, 2011, the GOP expanded their majority to 27–24, with one vacancy. The majority was expanded in the general election later that year to 31–21, including the party switch of Sen. Gray Tollison.

Members of the Mississippi Senate (2020–2024)

Past composition of the Senate

See also
Mississippi State Capitol
Mississippi Legislature
Mississippi House of Representatives

Notes

References

External links
Mississippi Legislature
State Senate of Mississippi at Project Vote Smart

Sen
Sen
State upper houses in the United States